Belinda Wilson is an Australian politician who is a member of the Victorian Legislative Assembly, representing the district of Narre Warren North. She is a member of the Labor Party and won her seat at the 2022 state election following the retirement of Labor MP Luke Donnellan.

Wilson has stated that she is a parent and owns a family business.

References

Year of birth missing (living people)
Living people
Australian Labor Party members of the Parliament of Victoria
Members of the Victorian Legislative Assembly
Women members of the Victorian Legislative Assembly
21st-century Australian politicians
21st-century Australian women politicians